Jason Strange (born 8 October 1973 in Tredegar, Wales) is a former Welsh rugby union player and now coach. An outside half, he was a prolific goal-kicker. Strange played his club rugby for a number of clubs in Wales including Pontypridd RFC, Ebbw Vale RFC, Newport RFC before joining Bristol RFC and Leeds Carnegie where he signed a 2-year contract to take him to the end of 2010. He was called up to Wales' squad for the 2000 Six Nations Championship and was on the bench against Scotland, however he was ultimately not capped at that level.

In 2010 he joined Ebbw Vale RFC as the coach. At the end of the 2013–14 season, they were promoted back to the Welsh Premiership League with a few games to spare. After 5 years with Ebbw Vale, Strange was hired by the WRU as a coach for the under 20s national side.

References

External links
Bristol profile
Leeds profile
Pontypridd profile

1973 births
Living people
Birmingham & Solihull R.F.C. players
Bristol Bears players
Ebbw Vale RFC players
Leeds Tykes players
Newport RFC players
Pontypridd RFC players
Rotherham Titans players
Rugby union players from Tredegar
Welsh rugby union players
Rugby union fly-halves